Emma: Queen of the South Seas is a 1988 Australian miniseries based on the life of Emma Forsayth.

The budget was $5.5 million.

Cast

 Barbara Carrera – Emma
 Steve Bisley – Tom Farrell
 Thaao Penghlis – Albert Steinberger
 Hal Holbrook – John Coe
 Barry Quin – The Hon. W. H. Lyttelton
 Ron Haddrick – Reverend Brown
 Gerard Kennedy – Captain Rabardy
 E. G. Marshall – President Grant

References

External links

1988 Australian television series debuts
1988 Australian television series endings
Network 10 original programming
1980s Australian television miniseries
English-language television shows
Television series by Tribune Entertainment